Cazenovia is a former populated place in section 21 of Troy Township in Pipestone County, Minnesota, United States.

History 
Cazenovia was founded in 1884 by pioneers from Madison County, New York.  It was named for a town and lake in said county.  The town had a post office from 1885 until 1938, and had a station of the Chicago, Rock Island and Pacific Railway.

References

External links 
HomeTownLocator Map of Cazenovia, Minnesota

Former populated places in Minnesota
Former populated places in Pipestone County, Minnesota